Françoise d'Eaubonne et l'écoféminisme is a book written by Caroline Goldblum and published in 2019 by the Passager Clandestin. This publication appeared in a context of renewed interest for ecofeminism in France and the republishing of Françoise d'Eaubonne essays such as “écologie et féminisme, révolution ou mutation ?" in 2018 and “le féminisme ou la mort"in 2020. It constitutes a mainstream tool to understand the foundation of d’Eaubonne idea of ecofeminism and is the first book dedicated exclusively to d'Eaubonne ecofeminism.

The Author 
Caroline Goldblum discovered the first ecofeminist theorist, Françoise d’Eaubonne, while working on the French feminist journal  called “sorcière” created by Xavière Gauthier in 1974. Passionate about the vast work of the pioneer of ecofeminism and degrowth theories, Goldblum first wrote a thesis on Françoise d’Eaubonne. She also participated to several publication on Françoise d'Eaubonne. She explores in her book the ecofeminist thinking of d'Eaubonne, poorly known in France because of an intellectual attachment to a beauvoirian feminism., as well as a rejection of d'Eaubonne radical positions and use of violence

Book Content 
The book starts by examining the political implications of Françoise d’Eaubonne who believes that all causes are linked and intertwined. This is the reason why she took part in communism, for the independence of Algeria, against psychiatry but also for women's rights and those of sexual minorities. Activist for gay rights and co-funder of ‘front homosexuel d’action révolutionnaire’, she is characterized as a faghag by the author

Her feminist engagement started in her childhood but significantly evolves with the publication of 'The Second Sex' in 1949 and her friendship with the feminist philosopher Simone de Beauvoir for who she wrote: “Une Femme nommée Castor mon amie Simone de Beauvoir”. In 1970 she took part in the “mouvement de libération des femmes”, also known as MLF, in which she started developing a reflection on ecology and feminism within the group  “écologie-féminisme centre”. Four years later in 1974, she published her first book on ecofeminism: “le féminisme ou la mort” and became the very first person to use and theorize the notion of ecofeminism. She advanced the idea that oppression of women and the destruction of the environment have a common origin: patriarchal capitalism. According to her ecofeminism thought, men have taken power over the fertility of lands and women's bodies that they dominate. This association is based on the Meadows report which exposed in 1972  the consequences of overpopulation and economic growth on the available resources. The political project of d’Eaubonne echoes to some extent to malthusianism as she defends the idea that women should stop getting pregnant and calls for a procreation strike

In the book, Goldblum agrees with French authors such as Emilie Hache. and Jeanne Burgart-Goutal asserting that the Françoise d’Eaubonne ecofeminism project succeeded in English-speaking countries due to linkages with the anti-nuclear and anti-militarist movements during the Cold War rather than the author's native France. She also produces her own cartography of ecofeminism by distinguishing materialist ecofeminism carried by Maria Mies and Vandana Shiva from spiritual ecofeminism reclaimed by the neo-pagan witch Starhawk. According to the author, the work of Mies and Shiva has several similarities with d'Eaubonne as they all denounce the consequences of patriarchal capitalism. Nonetheless, this is contrasted with spiritual ecofeminism which values the reappropriation of spirituality and religion leading to criticisms on its potential essentialist nature

Selected Texts 
The last section of the book is composed of a selection of texts by Goldblum that illustrates both d'Eaubonne ecofeminist thinking and critics of economic growth theories. The texts coming from d'Eaubonne's novels, essays and activist documents allow the reader to dive into her political project and philosophical approach.

The first selection deals with ecofeminism and highlights d'Eaubonne thoughts on the demographic explosion, the importance of procreation strike to abolish the patriarchal and sexist system as well as on women's role in the environmental crisis.

The second selection explores degrowth theories and develops critical thinking toward economic growth theories that are associated with Françoise d'Eaubonne with a picture of a chaotic system of domination and inequalities.

References 

2019 non-fiction books
French-language books
French non-fiction books